Here & Now: The Best of Human Nature is a greatest hits album by Australian vocal group Human Nature released on 16 November 2001.

Track listing 
 "Always Be With You"
 "Don't Cry"
 "Got it Goin' On"
 "He Don't Love You"
 "Wishes"
 "Whisper Your Name"
 "Don't Say Goodbye"
 "Shout"
 "Cruel"
 "Last to Know"
 "Every Time You Cry" (with John Farnham)
 "Be There With You"
 "Eternal Flame"
 "When we were young"
 "Tellin' Everybody"
 "People Get Ready"
 "Sign Your Name"

Charts

Weekly charts

End of Year Chart

Certifications

References

External links 
 Human Nature web page

Compilation albums by Australian artists
Human Nature (band) albums
2001 greatest hits albums